Jonny Murray (born August 10, 1974 in Quebec City, Quebec) is a National Hockey League linesman, who wears uniform number 95. He was one of the selected referees who officiated the 2012 Stanley Cup Finals. He also officiated the 2016 Stanley Cup Finals, 2018 Stanley Cup Finals, 2021 Stanley Cup Finals and 2022 Stanley Cup Finals.

References

1974 births
Canadian ice hockey officials
Ice hockey people from Quebec City
Living people
National Hockey League officials